Aksyutin (masculine) or Aksyutina (feminine) is a Russian last name, a variant of Aksyonov.

People with the last name
Oleg Aksyutin, executive director of Gasunie, a project company of South Stream, a planned gas pipeline
Sergey Aksyutin, Russian shooter participating in the 2004 Summer Olympics

Toponyms
Aksyutina (rural locality) (or Aksyutino), a rural locality (a village) in Karachevsky District of Bryansk Oblast, Russia;

See also
Aksyutino, a rural locality (a selo) in Asekeyevsky District of Orenburg Oblast, Russia

References

Notes

Sources
И. М. Ганжина (I. M. Ganzhina). "Словарь современных русских фамилий" (Dictionary of Modern Russian Last Names). Москва, 2001. 



Russian-language surnames